The list of shipwrecks in August 1923 includes ships sunk, foundered, grounded, or otherwise lost during August 1923.

1 August

2 August

3 August

6 August

8 August

10 August

13 August

16 August

18 August

19 August

21 August

22 August

23 August

24 August

25 August

26 August

27 August

29 August

30 August

31 August

References

1923-08
Maritime incidents in August 1923
08
August 1923 events